Lucious Brown Jackson (October 31, 1941 – October 12, 2022), also known as Luke Jackson, was an American professional basketball player. A power forward and center, he played for the Philadelphia 76ers of the National Basketball Association (NBA) from 1964 to 1972. He was named an NBA All-Star in 1965, and won an NBA championship with the 76ers in 1967. Jackson also played for the U.S. national team in the 1964 Summer Olympics.

Biography

Amateur career
Jackson was born on October 31, 1941, in San Marcos, Texas, and his family moved to Bastrop, Louisiana, when he was in high school because San Marcos would not allow him to play for the all-white basketball team. He graduated from Morehouse High School in Bastrop. He attended Pan American College and played college basketball for the Pan American Broncs. In 1963, United Press International named Jackson an All-American. He won the Chuck Taylor Most Valuable Player Award in the NAIA Men's Basketball Championships in 1963 and 1964.

Jackson played for the United States men's national basketball team at the 1963 Pan American Games and the 1963 FIBA World Championship. He was a member of the U.S. Olympic basketball team that won the gold at the 1964 Summer Olympics in Tokyo.

Professional career
The 76ers selected Jackson in the first round, with the fourth overall pick, in the 1964 NBA draft. He played eight seasons (1964–1972) with the Philadelphia 76ers in the NBA. A 6-foot, 9-inch (2.06 m) power forward who played center occasionally. He played in the 1965 NBA All-Star Game. After the season, he was named to the NBA's 1964–65 All-Rookie Team after averaging 14.8 points and 12.9 rebounds per game.

A teammate of Wilt Chamberlain, Jackson was a starter on the 1966–67 Philadelphia championship team that ended the Boston Celtics' string of eight straight NBA championships. He scored 13 points and had 21 rebounds in the title-clinching game over the San Francisco Warriors in the 1967 NBA Finals. After the 1968 season, the 76ers traded Chamberlain to the Lakers, and the 76ers moved Jackson back to center. Before the 1969–70 season, Jackson defected to the Carolina Cougars of the rival American Basketball Association. A few days later, he reneged on the agreement with Carolina, returning to the 76ers. He missed time during the season with an achilles' heel injury and a collapsed lung. Jackson continued to experience chronic injuries to his left foot, including a tendon and a toe bone. He retired after the 1971–72 season.

Personal life and death
Jackson and his wife, Marva, were married for 57 years before his death. After his retirement from basketball, they settled in Beaumont, Texas, Marva's hometown, in 1973. He finished his degree at Pan American University and worked for the Beaumont Parks and Recreation Department starting in 1975. He retired in 2002. They had three children, all of whom played basketball at West Brook High School and collegiately. Nicole and Andrea played for the University of North Texas and Lucious III, played college basketball for Syracuse University.

The 1990s all-female rock band Luscious Jackson chose their name as inspiration from Lucious Jackson.

Jackson died from heart failure in Houston, Texas, on October 12, 2022, at the age of 80.

NBA career statistics 

Source

Regular season

Playoffs

References

External links

1941 births
2022 deaths
1963 FIBA World Championship players
20th-century African-American sportspeople
African-American basketball players
American men's basketball players
Basketball players at the 1963 Pan American Games
Basketball players at the 1964 Summer Olympics
Basketball players from Texas
Centers (basketball)
Medalists at the 1963 Pan American Games
Medalists at the 1964 Summer Olympics
National Basketball Association All-Stars
Olympic gold medalists for the United States in basketball
Pan American Games gold medalists for the United States
Pan American Games medalists in basketball
Philadelphia 76ers draft picks
Philadelphia 76ers players
Power forwards (basketball)
Sportspeople from San Marcos, Texas
Texas–Pan American Broncs men's basketball players
Texas Southern Tigers men's basketball players
United States men's national basketball team players